John Dlugos (July 26, 1928 – April 10, 2018) was a Canadian football player who played for the Edmonton Eskimos from 1949 to 1951. He played junior football for the Saskatoon Hilltops. He died in Victoria, British Columbia.

References

1928 births
2018 deaths
Canadian football tackles
Edmonton Elks players
Players of Canadian football from Saskatchewan
Sportspeople from Saskatoon